Henry Scobell (baptised 1610; died 1660) was an English Parliamentary official, and editor of official publications. He was clerk to the Long Parliament, and wrote on parliamentary procedure and precedents.

Life

Initially under-clerk of the parliaments, Scobell became Clerk of the House of Commons from 5 January 1649, his predecessor Henry Elsynge having resigned. Scobell also held a position as censor of publications, and then was Clerk of the Parliaments for life with effect from 14 May 1649. He was the first editor, from 9 October 1649, of Severall Proceedings in Parliament, an early official newspaper, and the second of Parliament's publications.

In the Rump Parliament, Scobell found himself in the middle of the clashes leading to its dissolution in 1653. He remained Clerk to Barebone's Parliament.

From 1655 Scobell became Clerk to the Council of State, a large jump in status, in succession to John Thurloe and sharing the position with William Jessop. Up to then he had been for a period an assistant secretary to the council.

In 1658, as a preliminary to the Savoy Assembly, Scobell called together elders of Independent churches from the London area, in the house of George Griffith (bishop). He himself was an elder of the Congregational church of John Rowe, meeting in Westminster Abbey.

In October 1659 he was one of those calling on George Monck to intervene in the vacuum of power after the death of Oliver Cromwell.

Works
.
.
.

Notes

External links

Henry Scobell: King Charles I Trial - UK Parliament Living Heritage

17th-century births
1660 deaths
Clerks of the House of Commons
Clerks of the Parliaments